The Pensioners' Party (Partito Pensionati, PP) is a centrist Italian political party, whose aim is to represent the interests of pensioners.

History
The Pensioners' Party was founded in 1987 in Milan, and its current leader is Carlo Fatuzzo.

In the 2004 European Parliament election, it gained 1.1% of the national vote and elected its leader to the European Parliament, where he sits in the European People's Party–European Democrats group.

On 4 February 2006, the party joined The Union, the centre-left coalition led by Romano Prodi, and was decisive in the result of the 2006 general election (the PP scored 0.9% and the centre-left won by a 0.1% margin), but soon after the election the alliance with the centre-left turned cold and tense. In the European Parliament, Antonio Tajani (Forza Italia, Vice President of the European People's Party), tried successfully to convince Fatuzzo to return to the centre-right coalition.

Finally, on 20 November 2006, Carlo Fatuzzo, in a press conference along with Antonio Tajani and Fabrizio Cicchitto (national deputy-coordinator of Forza Italia), announced that its party was re-joining the centre-right House of Freedoms coalition.

In the 2008 general election the Pensioners' Party presented its candidates into The People of Freedom, but it didn't gained any seat.

In the 2009 European Parliament election, the party ran as part of The Autonomy, an electoral coalition including The Right, the Movement for the Autonomies and the Alliance of the Centre.

In 2012 the party enters for the first time in the Italian Parliament with one deputy, Lino Miserotti, who replaces the outgoing deputy Marco Airaghi, and with one senator, Giacinto Boldrini, who replaces the deceased senator Gianpiero Carlo Cantoni.

In the 2013 general election the Pensioners' Party ran with the Centre-right coalition, getting only the 0.16% of the vote for the Chamber and the 0.40% for the Senate.

In the 2018 general election the party signed a cooperation Agreement with Forza Italia and some members of the party were candidate in FI's lists, including party's secretary Carlo Fatuzzo, who was elected in the Chamber of Deputies.

Electoral results

Italian Parliament

European Parliament

Regional Councils

References

Political parties established in 1987
Pensioners' parties
The Autonomy
Single-issue parties in Italy